Abbott and Costello in the Foreign Legion is a black and white 1950 American comedy film directed by Charles Lamont and starring the comedy team of Abbott and Costello.

It is set in the French Sahara with the heroes having joined the French Foreign Legion.

Plot
Bud Jones and Lou Hotchkiss are wrestling promoters in Brooklyn.  Their star, the proud Abdullah, no longer wishes to follow the script for their pre-arranged bouts, especially since he is supposed to lose his next match. Abdullah leaves America to return to his homeland, Algeria.  The promoters' financiers, a syndicate that has lent them $5,000 to bring Abdullah to the States, now require that they return the money or face the consequences. The two men follow Abdullah to Algiers in hope of bringing him back.

Lou shows a local woman "how to wrestle", but this is misconstrued.

Meanwhile, Abdullah's cousin, Sheik Hamud El Khalid and a crooked Foreign Legionnaire, Sgt. Axmann, have been raiding a railroad construction site in order to extort "protection" money from the railroad company. When Bud and Lou arrive they are mistaken for company spies, and the Sheik and Axmann send three scary looking Arabs to attempt to murder them. As each attempt fails, the assassins' hatred for Bud and Lou intensifies, especially when Lou unintentionally outbids the Sheik for six slave girls, one of whom, Nicole, is actually a French spy assigned to gain entry into the Sheik's camp, so she had wanted the Sheik to win the auction. The boys are then chased, only to wind up hiding at the Foreign Legion headquarters, where Axmann tricks them into signing up for the Legion, with the swearing-in ceremony being in French. 

Their first duty is bayonet practice in the desert. The Legion Commandant suspects that there is a traitor among the Legionnaires, because the Sheik correctly anticipates every one of the Legion's moves (secretly through Axmann).  The Commandant then grants Bud and Lou a pass into town where they discovers Axmann's alliance with the Arabs before meeting Nicole. She informs them that they must search Axmann's room for proof that he is a traitor, but he catches them in the act. However, they are spared, and end up at a Legionnaire desert camp. At night, just before the camp is ambushed by the Sheik's men, Bud and Lou wander off in search of a camel that ran off, and thus they escape death, but resultantly wander the desert with no water. Lou starts to see mirages, including an ice cream soda stand and a newspaper vendor. When Bud finds a real oasis Lou thinks it is another mirage.

They are eventually captured, along with Nicole, who is put in Sheik Hamud's harem. The Sheik orders that one of his wrestlers execute them. The wrestler turns out to be Abdullah, who helps them escape so he can escape from being married to an unattractive woman. They head to Fort Apar, where they lure the Sheik's men inside and then blow it up. They are given medals by the Commandant but also given an honourable discharge from the Legion. Lou thanks Nicole for helping them and gives his award to her before they leave, only for Bud to find out that Lou is taking the six slave girls with them back to the States.

Cast
 Bud Abbott as Bud Jones
 Lou Costello as Lou Hotchkiss
 Patricia Medina as Nicole Dupre
 Walter Slezak as Sgt. Axmann
 Douglass Dumbrille as Sheik Hamud El Khalid
 Leon Belasco as Hassam—Auctioneer
 Marc Lawrence as Frankie—Loan Shark
 William 'Wee Willie' Davis as Abdullah (as Wee Willie Davis)
 Tor Johnson as Abou Ben
 Sammy Menacker as Bertram the Magnificent (as Sam Menacker)
 Jack Raymond as Ali Ami
 Fred Nurney as Commandant
 Paul Fierro as Ibn
 Henry Corden as Ibrim
 Candy Candido as Skeleton (voice) (uncredited)
 Dan Seymour as Josef (uncredited)

Production
Originally scheduled to begin shooting in December 1949, filming was postponed when Costello had to undergo an operation for a gangrenous gallbladder in November 1949. Filming eventually began on April 28, 1950, and ended on May 29, 1950. Despite having a stunt double, Costello did his own wrestling in the film, suffering a wrenched arm socket and a stretched tendon.

In 1948, Abbott and Costello fired their agent, Eddie Sherman. Just before the filming of this picture, they reconciled with Sherman and rehired him.

David Gorcey, a member of the comedy team The Bowery Boys, has a cameo appearance in the film. The voice of the skeleton in the film was provided by Candy Candido, who briefly became Abbott's partner in the 1960s after Costello had died.

Some music from Abbott and Costello Meet Frankenstein was recycled for this film.

According to Rudolph Grey's book Nightmare of Ecstasy, filmmaker Edward D. Wood, Jr. worked on the film as a production assistant.

Home media
This film has been released three times on DVD. Originally released as single DVD on August 12, 1998, it was released twice as part of two different Abbott and Costello collections, The Best of Abbott and Costello Volume Three, on August 3, 2004, and again on October 28, 2008 as part of Abbott and Costello: The Complete Universal Pictures Collection.

Notes

References

External links

1950 films
1950 comedy films
Abbott and Costello films
American black-and-white films
1950s English-language films
Films directed by Charles Lamont
Films set in Algiers
Films set in Algeria
Films set in deserts
Films set in New York City
Professional wrestling films
Films about the French Foreign Legion
Military humor in film
Universal Pictures films
American comedy films
1950s American films